Jorge Jiménez may refer to:
Jorge Jiménez (Chilean politician) (born 1944), Chilean Christian Democrat politician
Jorge Jiménez (archer) (born 1967), El Salvador archer
Jorge Franco Jiménez (born 1943), Mexican politician
Jorge Jiménez Cantú (1914–2005), Mexican physician and politician
Jorge Volio Jiménez (1882–1955), Costa Rican priest, soldier and politician